Dimas Lara Barbosa (born April 1, 1956) is a Brazilian prelate of the Roman Catholic Church. He served as auxiliary bishop of São Sebastião do Rio de Janeiro from 2003 till 2011, when he became archbishop of Campo Grande.

Life 
Born in Boa Esperança, Lara Barbosa was ordained to the priesthood on December 3, 1988, serving in São José dos Campos.

On June 11, 2003, he was appointed auxiliary bishop of São Sebastião do Rio de Janeiro and titular bishop of Megalopolis in Proconsulari. Lara Barbosa received his episcopal consecration on the following August 2 from Eusébio Oscar Scheid, archbishop of São Sebastião do Rio de Janeiro, with the bishop of São José dos Campos, José Nelson Westrupp, and the auxiliary bishop of Brasília, Raymundo Damasceno Assis, serving as co-consecrators.

On May 4, 2011, he was appointed archbishop of Campo Grande. He was installed on the following July 10.

External links 
 Entry about Dimas Lara Barbosa at catholic-hierarchy.org

1956 births
21st-century Roman Catholic archbishops in Brazil
Living people
Roman Catholic bishops of São Sebastião do Rio de Janeiro